For Groin see:

Groin (human body)
Groin attack (technique)
Groyne (sea wall or river training structure)
Groin vault, a type of vaulted chamber in medieval architecture